Peter Bergman (born 1953) is an American actor.

Peter Bergman may also refer to:
Peter Bergman (comedian) (1939-2012), of The Firesign Theater
The Peter Bergman gallery

See also
Peter Bergmann (1915-2002), physicist
Peter Bergmann case